Médiatrice Ahishakiye (born 1978) is a Rwandan politician, currently a member of the Chamber of Deputies in the Parliament of Rwanda.

Ahishakiye represents the Southern Province and her district is Huye District.

Ahishakiye has previously worked as a teacher, a head teacher, a secretary of the Gisagara District council, and as a member of the Gisagara District council.

In the 2018 parliamentary election, Ahishakiye was elected to the Chamber of Deputies as a women's representative in the Parliament of Rwanda.

References 

1978 births
Living people
Members of the Chamber of Deputies (Rwanda)
21st-century Rwandan women politicians
21st-century Rwandan politicians